Orca Health is a private healthcare technology company. Based in Salt Lake City, Utah, the company develops mobile patient education software for physicians on Apple iOS.

Orca Health has collaborated with Harvard University to develop applications and ebooks relating to the human heart.

References 

Software companies based in Utah
2010 establishments in Utah
Health care companies established in 2010
Software companies established in 2010
American companies established in 2010
Defunct software companies of the United States